The 2006–07 Serbian SuperLiga (known as the Meridian SuperLiga for sponsorship reasons) season started on 5 August 2006. The winners were Red Star Belgrade with their 25th title. FK Zemun and FK Voždovac were relegated to the 2nd league of Serbia. The SuperLiga will change format from next season with the league no longer being divided into title and relegation groups midway through the campaign. Instead the 12 teams will play each other three times in a conventional league format.

Teams

Regular season

League table

Results

Play-offs

Championship round

League table

Results

Relegation round

League table

Results

Winning squad
Champions: RED STAR BELGRADE (coach: Dušan Bajević, Boško Đurovski)
players (league matches/league goals):
 Dušan Đokić (28/14)
 Nenad Milijaš (25/5)
 Dušan Anđelković (24/1)
 Ibrahima Gueye (24/0)
 Segundo Castillo (23/8) signed from El Nacional on 31 August 2006 – the last day of summer 2006 transfer window
 Dejan Milovanović (23/3)
 Ivan Ranđelović (23/0) -goalkeeper-
 Milan Purović (22/6)
 Aleksandar Pantić (21/0)
 Aleksandar Trišović (21/0)
 Blagoy Georgiev (20/2)
 Marko Perović (18/0)
 Nikola Trajković (17/0)
 Dušan Basta (16/0)
 Đorđe Tutorić (15/0)
 Milan Biševac (14/2)
 Igor Burzanović (13/3)
 Milanko Rašković (13/3)
 Ognjen Koroman (12/2) arrived on loan in early February 2007 during 2006/07 winter transfer window
 Aílton (11/3) signed on 31 August 2006 – the last day of summer 2006 transfer window
 Ely Tadeu (10/0)
 Miloš Bajalica (9/0)
 Nebojša Joksimović (9/0)
 Zoran Banović (7/0) -goalkeeper-
 Vladimir Đorđević (5/0)
 Nikola Žigić (3/2) sold to Racing de Santander on 29 August 2006 during 2006 summer transfer window
 Nenad Kovačević (3/0) sold to RC Lens in August 2006 during 2006 summer transfer window
 Radovan Krivokapić (3/0)
 Bojan Miladinović (3/0)
 Saša Radivojević (3/0)
 Boško Janković (2/0) sold to Real Mallorca in August 2006 during 2006 summer transfer window
 Nenad Srećković (2/0)
 Miloš Reljić (1/1)
 Goran Adamović (1/0)
 Marko Nikolić (1/0)
 Slavko Perović (1/0)

Relegation playoff 
Third placed team from Serbian First League meets the 3rd from the bottom placed team from Serbian SuperLiga in a home-and-away tie. The aggregate winner gets a spot in 2007–08 SuperLiga.

 Napredak – Borac 0–0
 Borac – Napredak 1–0
1:0 Irfan Vušljanin (42')

Top scorers

Promoted teams 
The following teams were  promoted to the Meridian SuperLiga at the end of the 2006–07 season:

 Mladost Lučani – Serbian First League champions
 Čukarički Stankom – Serbian First League runners-up
 Napredak Kruševac – will play in the Serbian SuperLiga for 2007/08 season despite losing the relegation playoff to Napredak Kruševac because Mladost Apatin withdrew from competition in 2007–08 SuperLiga due to being unable to bear the financial burden of playing in a top division.

Relegated teams 
The following teams were relegated to the Serbian First League at the end of the 2006–07 season:

 Zemun – Automatically relegated after finishing in 12th position with only 7 points from 32 games.
 Voždovac – Automatically relegated after finishing in 11th position.
 Mladost Apatin – Withdrew due to financial reasons.

External links 
 2006-07 season at UEFA.com
 Tables and results at RSSSF

Serbian SuperLiga seasons
1
Serbia